Team Soho (formerly credited as SCEE Internal Development Team or also known as SCEE Studio Soho) was a British first-party video game developer and a studio of Sony Computer Entertainment based in Soho, London.

The company was founded in 1994. The original development staff had little to no experience in the video game industry, with most of them being recent college graduates. They started out with developing NBA ShootOut, the first entry of the NBA ShootOut series, which released in 1996. In 2002, the studio was closed and merged with SCEE Studio Camden (former Psygnosis Camden Studio) to form London Studio. The Team Soho brand was retained for The Getaway: Black Monday.

The Getaway creative director, Brendan McNamara, founded Team Bondi in mid-2003 in Sydney, and had hired several former staff members of Team Soho. After Bondi's closure, he founded Videogames Deluxe.

List of software developed

References

External links 

1994 establishments in England
2002 disestablishments in England
2002 mergers and acquisitions
British subsidiaries of foreign companies
Companies based in the City of Westminster
Defunct companies based in London
Defunct video game companies of the United Kingdom
English brands
First-party video game developers
PlayStation Studios
Software companies based in London
Soho, London
Video game companies disestablished in 2002
Video game companies established in 1994